Tragic Epilogue is the first studio album by American hip hop group Antipop Consortium. It was released on 75 Ark on February 22, 2000. The group's member Beans described it as "a eulogy to the end of hip-hop".

Critical reception

James P. Wisdom of Pitchfork gave the album a 6.5 out of 10, saying: "It's an auspicious debut, but one that's more likely to draw your attention to the band's future than to send you scattering for spare change to pick it up." Ron Hart of CMJ New Music Report called it "a disjointed mindfuck of a rap album that aims to completely throw off your equilibrium" and stated that "Tragic Epilogue will appeal to both street and experimental heads alike." Jason Birchmeier of AllMusic wrote: "Though the album wasn't quite as daring as Antipop Consortium's successive releases, it nonetheless garnered substantial acclaim, placing the group among similarly edgy New York underground rap artists such as Company Flow."

The Wire named it the record of the year in its annual critics poll. In 2015, Fact placed it at number 75 on the "100 Best Indie Hip-Hop Records of All Time" list.

Track listing

Personnel
Credits adapted from liner notes.

Anti Pop Consortium
 High Priest – vocals, production (1, 3, 11, 16, 17, 19), synthesizer (9), executive production
 Beans – vocals, production (2, 8, 12, 14), drums (9)
 Sayyid – vocals, production (5, 6, 7, 13)
 E. Blaize – production (4, 15, 18), co-production, engineering, mixing

Additional musicians
 Electro Foetus – production (10)
 Aceyalone – vocals (17)
 Apany B-Fly MC – vocals (18)
 Pharoah Monch – vocals (19)
 L.I.F.E. – vocals (19)

Technical personnel
 Vassos – mastering

References

External links
 

2000 debut albums
Antipop Consortium albums
75 Ark albums